The golf competition at the 2022 Pacific Mini Games will be held from 21–24 June 2022 at the Coral Ocean Resort Golf Course in Saipan, Northern Mariana Islands.

Competition schedule

Participating nations
As of 1 June 2022, eleven countries and territories have confirmed their participation in the golf competition for the games. Each Pacific Games association is allowed to enter a maximum of eight athletes (four of each gender).

Medal summary

References

Golf at the Pacific Games
2022 Pacific Mini Games
2022 Pacific Mini Games
Pacific Mini Games